WSTF may refer to:

WSTF (FM), a radio station (91.5 FM) licensed to Andalusia, Alabama, United States
WJRR, a radio station (101.1 FM) licensed to Cocoa Beach, Florida, United States that held the call sign WSTF from 1985 to 1992
Web Services Test Forum - provides an interoperability test framework for the Web Service community
White Sands Test Facility - a NASA rocket engine test facility located in the foothills of the Organ Mountains, eleven miles east of Las Cruces, New Mexico
Westaff - a staffing company based primarily out of Walnut Creek, California, United States and traded publicly on the NASDAQ market, using the stock symbol WSTF
Williams Syndrome Transcription Factor is another name for the human gene Bromodomain adjacent to zinc finger domain, 1B, also known as BAZ1B